Vladimir Khlud (born 18 March 1964) is a Belarusian weightlifter. He competed in the men's middle heavyweight event at the 1996 Summer Olympics.

References

External links
 

1964 births
Living people
Belarusian male weightlifters
Olympic weightlifters of Belarus
Weightlifters at the 1996 Summer Olympics
Sportspeople from Brest Region